Los Tojos is a municipality located in the autonomous community of Cantabria, Spain.

Localities 
Its 449 inhabitants (INE, 2010) live in:
 Bárcena Mayor, 86 hab.
 Correpoco, 51 hab. 
 Saja, 104 hab.
 El Tojo, 88 hab.
 Los Tojos (Capital), 120 hab.

References

Municipalities in Cantabria